Qaleh-ye Reza (also Romanized as Qal‘eh-ye Reẕā and Qal‘eh Rez̧ā; also known as Qal‘a Ruza and Qal‘eh Ruza) is a village in Hasanabad Rural District, in the Central District of Ravansar County, Kermanshah Province, Iran. At the 2006 census, its population was 39, in 10 families.

References 

Populated places in Ravansar County